Pompanos are marine fishes in the genus Trachinotus in the family Carangidae (better known as "jacks"). Pompano may also refer to various other, similarly shaped members of the Carangidae, or the order Perciformes. Their appearance is of deep-bodied fishes, exhibiting strong lateral compression, with a rounded face and pronounced curve to the anterior portion of their dorsal profile. Their ventral profile is noticeably less curved by comparison, while their anterior profile is straight-edged, tapering sharply to a narrow caudal peduncle. Their dorsal and anal fins are typically sickle-shaped, with very long anterior rays and a succession of much shorter rays behind, with a similarly long & curved, deeply forked tail which has a narrow base. They are typically overall silvery in color, sometimes with dark or yellowish fins, and one or a few black markings on the side of their body. They are found worldwide in warmer seas, sometimes also entering brackish waters.

Of the 21 recognized species, most are valued as food and some are considered game fish, including the permit (T. falcatus). Several United States Navy submarines have been named after this genus: USS Pompano and USS Permit.

Species

The 21 currently recognized species in this genus are:

 Trachinotus africanus J. L. B. Smith, 1967 (southern pompano)
 Trachinotus anak J. D. Ogilby, 1909 (oyster pompano)
 Trachinotus baillonii (Lacépède, 1801) (smallspotted dart)
 Trachinotus blochii (Lacépède, 1801) (snubnose pompano)
 Trachinotus botla (G. Shaw, 1803) (largespotted dart)
 Trachinotus carolinus (Linnaeus, 1766) (Florida pompano)
 Trachinotus cayennensis G. Cuvier, 1832 (Cayenne pompano)
 Trachinotus coppingeri Günther, 1884 (swallowtail dart)
 Trachinotus falcatus (Linnaeus, 1758) (permit)
 Trachinotus goodei D. S. Jordan & Evermann, 1896 (palometa)
 Trachinotus goreensis G. Cuvier, 1832 (longfin pompano)
 Trachinotus kennedyi Steindachner, 1876 (blackblotch pompano)
 Trachinotus macrospilus Smith-Vaniz & Walsh, 2019 (Marquesas dart)
 Trachinotus marginatus G. Cuvier, 1832 (plata pompano)
 Trachinotus maxillosus G. Cuvier, 1832 (Guinean pompano)
 Trachinotus mookalee G. Cuvier, 1832 (Indian pompano)
 Trachinotus ovatus (Linnaeus, 1758) (pompano)
 Trachinotus paitensis G. Cuvier, 1832 (Paloma pompano)
 Trachinotus rhodopus T. N. Gill, 1863 (gafftopsail pompano)
 Trachinotus stilbe (D. S. Jordan & E. A. McGregor, 1899) (steel pompano)
 Trachinotus teraia G. Cuvier, 1832 (shortfin pompano)

References

External links
 

Taxa named by Bernard Germain de Lacépède
Trachinotinae
Trachinotus